Magnus Lekara Kpakol  is the CEO, Chairman and Chief Strategist at the Economic and Business Strategies, with offices in the United States and Nigeria. He is a prolific speaker, motivator and trainer. He has spoken at conferences and seminars around the world. He is the principal leadership, management and business coach/trainer at the Economic and Business Strategies Ltd. He was the principal consultant at VIJONS International in Dallas Texas and a visiting professor of economics at the University of Dallas, where he taught economic development and international economics before being appointed in 2001 as Chief economic adviser to the president of Nigeria by President Olusegun Obasanjo.

Early life and education

Magnus Lekara Kpakol, Ph.D. was born in B. Dere, Gokana in Rivers State of Nigeria. He attended Saint Pius X College, Bodo City, and Baptist High School, Port Harcourt before leaving for the United States as a teenager in the mid 1970s. He obtained a Bachelor of Science Degree from the University of Wisconsin, (1978); did graduate studies in Economics and Industrial Relations at the University of Minnesota, Minneapolis and in 1982, obtained a Master of Science Degree in Labor Economics and Industrial Relations at the University of North Texas in Denton. In 1983 he received an M.A. in Political Economy from the University of Texas at Dallas from where in 1988 he also obtained a Ph.D in Political Economy, specializing in economic development and international economics.

Presidential Advisor 

Magnus Kpakol was Chief Economic Adviser to the President of Nigeria from July 2001 to May 2003. While serving as Chief Economic Adviser to President Olusegun Obasanjo, he was also the Chief Executive Officer of the National Planning Commission, and a member of cabinet in the Federal Executive Council, working with the Minister of Finance, and Governor of the Central Bank on fiscal and monetary policies.

Beginning in June 2003, he served for eight years as a Senior Special Assistant to the President and was also the National Coordinator of the National Poverty Eradication Program (NAPEP). His administration at National Poverty Eradication Program developed a unique Conditional Cash Transfer (CCT) program (COPE) with a Poverty Reduction Accelerator Investment (PRAI) component. He also adopted the Village Economic Development Solutions (Village Solutions); and initiated the Promise Keeper Partnership (PKP) program for poor people in faith based organizations. In respect of some of these programs he implemented at NAPEP, stories were published in the media about his being indicted by the Nigerian Senate, with claims of misappropriation of funds and scam, and also of his and the Senate's refutal of such stories

Recent and Other Professional Experience 

Magnus Kpakol lives in Dallas, Texas, where he is the Chairman, CEO and Chief Strategist at the Economic and Business Strategies (EBS); he is also the host of Magnus Kpakol gvA, a global economic trends show on Africa carried around the world on Africa Independent Television. He is also the Founder and Chairman of the Economic Growth and Development Center (EGDC), the initiators of SHAFRI  and Village Solutions; Chairman of VIJONS, an International Business and Management Consulting firm based in Dallas, Texas.

Before working with the government of Nigeria as an advisor, he was a senior economist in the Planning & Research department of JCPenney Company based in Plano Texas. He was also a visiting professor of economics at the University of Dallas and previous to that an adjunct professor of economics at the same university; he also  taught in the Graduate School of Business at the University of Dallas. He was also an adjunct professor at the University of North Texas in Denton, and North Lake College in Irving, Texas. He was the Director and Principal Consultant at VIJONS, based in Dallas Texas.

He served as a consultant for the United Nations Development Program (UNDP), He has spoken at conferences around the world and appeared on various articles, radio and TV programs  Redoubling Efforts to BoostExports. He founded MAGONI Productions, the creators of Magoni music with roots in Ogoni rhythm.

Kpakol was a member of the Board of Trustees of John Brown University in Siloam Springs, Arkansas. He is a member of the Dallas Economists’ Club, where he was chairman of the Education Committee. He is also a member of the American Economic Association, the National Association of Business Economics (NABE) and its International Roundtable.

References 

Year of birth missing (living people)
Living people
Educators from Rivers State
University of Texas alumni
University of Dallas faculty
University of Minnesota alumni
University of North Texas alumni
People from Gokana
Nigerian expatriate academics in the United States